The 2020–21 Sudan Premier League was the 50th season of the Sudan Premier League, the top-tier football league in Sudan. The season started on 27 December 2020 and ended on 23 August 2021.

Stadiums and locations

Source:

League table

References

Sudan Premier League seasons
Sudan
football
football